Cosmin Gabriel Manole (born 22 October 1995) is a Romanian rugby union player. He plays as a prop for professional SuperLiga club Dinamo București.

Club career
In 2014 he started his professional journey joining SuperLiga side, Dinamo București.

International career
Manole is also selected for Romania's national team, the Oaks, making his international debut during the 2016 season of 2014–16 European Nations Cup First Division in a match against the Lelos on 19 March 2016.

References

External links
 
 
 

1995 births
Living people
Romanian rugby union players
Romania international rugby union players
CS Dinamo București (rugby union) players
Rugby union props